The  election was held on 12 April 2014 for 9th assembly of Sikkim, the northeastern state of India. It elected 32 members of Sikkim Legislative Assembly.

Background
Pawan Chamling led SDF had already formed the previous four governments in Sikkim having first formed the government after the 1994 election, when they won 19 seats within a year of the party being formed, and then again after the 1999 election, when they increased their tally to 24 seats. Chamling's third term began on 21 May 2004 after increasing his tally to 31.
In the 2009 Sikkim Legislative Assembly election, the SDF had a clean-sweep winning all 32 seats in the state assembly and Chamling sworn in as a Chief Minister fourth times on 20 May 2009. SDF is contesting for the fifth consecutive term.

Campaign and issues 
The Buddhist minority demanded Karmapa to contest from Rumtek monastery. Nepali community in Sikkim demanded tribal status.

Sikkim Krantikari Morcha (SKM) was formed by Prem Singh Tamang in February 2013. Prem Singh Tamang alias P S Golay left Chamling's SDF in September 2014 and joined SKM. SKM contested from all 32 seats.

Schedule of election

Polling
There were  eligible voters including  female voters. 538 polling stations were set up by election commission which were guarded by 3500 policemen and 15 companies of the West Bengal Police. There are two seats reserved for Scheduled Castes (SC), 12 for Bhutia-Lepcha (BL) communities out of 32 seats. One seat (Sangha) is reserved for 2900 monks of over 100 monasteries.

SKM leader Golay contested from Namthang-Rateypani seat against incumbent SDF minister Tilu Gurung.

SDF leader and incumbent chief minister Chamling contested from two places, Namchi-Singhithang and Rangang-Yangang.

Voter turnout
Total 80.97% of electorate including 80.57% males and 81.40% females cast their vote.

Voter turnout at each constituency was as below:

Parties and candidates

Results 
Votes were counted and results were declared on 16 May 2014. SDF lost 10 seats to SKM resulting in formation of opposition in the assembly which did not exist in previous assembly.

List of winners
The candidates elected to seventh legislative assembly are listed below:

Government formation 
SDF led by Chamling secured majority by winning 22 out of 32 seats. SKM won the rest ten seats.

Pawan Kumar Chamling was sworn in as the Chief Minister of Sikkim for the fifth time on 21 May 2014 by Shriniwas Dadasaheb Patil, the Governor of Sikkim. He became the chief minister fifth time, a record previously held by Jyoti Basu who ruled West Bengal from 1977 to 2000.

See also
 Sikkim Legislative Assembly

References

2014 State Assembly elections in India
April 2014 events in India
State Assembly elections in Sikkim
2010s in Sikkim